Hereke railway station is a railway station in Hereke, Turkey. TCDD Taşımacılık operates four daily regional trains between Istanbul and Adapazarı that stop at the station. The station was originally built in 1873 by the Ottoman government as part of a railway from Kadıköy to İzmit.

Hereke station was closed down on 1 February 2012 due to construction of the Ankara-Istanbul high-speed railway. The station was reopened on 4 August 2017.

References

External links
TCDD Taşımacılık

Railway stations in Kocaeli Province
Railway stations opened in 1873
1873 establishments in the Ottoman Empire